Martin Goodman may refer to:
Martin Goodman (historian) (born 1953), British historian and academic
Martin Goodman (publisher) (1908–1992), American publisher of pulp magazines, paperbacks, adventure magazines, and comic books
Martin J. Goodman (born 1956), English author and journalist
Martin Wise Goodman, Canadian journalist, editor-in-chief of The Toronto Star
Martin Goodman, character in British sitcom Friday Night Dinner